Strategic uranium reserves refer to uranium inventories held by the government of a particular country, as well as private industry, for the purpose of providing economic and national security during an energy crisis.

North America
In the early 1990s, the United States created a temporary strategic uranium reserve. The authorization for this reserve expired in 1998:

There is hereby established the National Strategic Uranium Reserve under the direction and control of the Secretary. The Reserve shall consist of natural uranium and uranium equivalents contained in stockpiles or inventories currently held by the United States for defense purposes. Effective on October 24, 1992, and for 6 years thereafter, use of the Reserve shall be restricted to military purposes and government research. Use of the Department of Energy’s stockpile of enrichment tails existing on October 24, 1992, shall be restricted to military purposes for 6 years thereafter.

Recently, due to increases in the price of uranium the Department of Energy has considered the creation of a permanent strategic uranium reserve along the lines of the U.S. strategic petroleum reserve.

Asia
China has announced the creation of a strategic uranium reserve to complement its strategic petroleum reserves.

Japan has also shown interest in creating its own strategic reserve of uranium.

See also

Nuclear power
Global strategic petroleum reserves
Strategic Petroleum Reserve
List of uranium mines
Uranium reserves

Uranium
United States Department of Energy
Energy policy